Konar Sandal is a Bronze Age archaeological site, situated in the valley of the Halil River just south of Jiroft, Kermān Province, Iran.

Description 
The site consists of two mounds a few kilometers apart, called Konar Sandal A and B  with a height of 13 and 21 meters, respectively. At Konar Sandal B, a two-story, windowed citadel with a  base of close to 13.5 hectares was found. Also found in Konar Sandal were tablets with scripts of unknown nature.

Near Konar there are several other ancient sites from the same time period such as Hajjiabad-Varamin, the graveyards located at Mahtoutabad, and the mounds of Qaleh Koutchek.

Jiroft culture 

The site is associated with the hypothesized "Jiroft culture", a 3rd millennium BC culture postulated on the basis of a collection of artifacts confiscated in 2001, criticized for conjecture about material not found in secure archaeological contexts and probably including forgeries. So the excavation of Konar Sandal is important in discovering artefacts in context. 

Yousef Majidzadeh, head of the archaeological excavation team in Konar Sandal which began work after the 2001 confiscation, has identified the site as an  "independent Bronze Age civilization with its own architecture and language". Majidzadeh suggests they may be the remains of the lost Aratta Kingdom. Other conjectures (e.g. Daniel T. Potts, Piotr Steinkeller) have connected the site with the obscure city-state of Marhashi.

A 2013 research paper about the South mound states that excavations during 2006 to 2009 "revealed the remains of three successive settlements dating to the fourth millennium BC".

Excavation re-commenced in 2014 and revealed art works of "complexity and beauty" and artifacts that proved that the society had several writing systems. According to National Geographic, the content of the mounds is significant:They turned out to contain the remains of two major architectural complexes. The northern mound included a cult building, while in the southern one were the remains of a fortified citadel. At the foot of the mounds, buried under many feet of sediment, were the remains of smaller buildings. It’s believed that the two mounds had once formed part of a unified urban settlement that stretched many miles across the plateau" ... [artifacts] "have been dated to between 2500 and 2200 B.C. [They are said to be evidence of] the "development of a complex civilization".

References

Further reading

 Elisa Cortesi, Maurizio Tosi, Alessandra Lazzari, Massimo Vidale (2008), Cultural Relationships beyond the Iranian Plateau: The Helmand Civilization, Baluchistan and the Indus Valley in the 3rd Millennium BCE. Paléorient 34(2):5-35, 

Archaeological sites in Iran
Bronze Age sites
Former populated places in Iran
Buildings and structures in Kerman Province
Helmand culture
Jiroft culture